Asura octiger is a moth of the family Erebidae. It is found on Buru.

References

octiger
Moths described in 1929
Moths of Indonesia